Solomon Williams "Doc" Newton (September 25, 1893 – June 20, 1970) was a minor league baseball player as well as an American football and baseball coach.  He served as the head football coach at Davidson College (1932–1935), North Carolina State University (1937–1943), the University of South Carolina (1944), and Guilford College (1945–1948), compiling a career college football record of 59–77–14.  Newton was also the head baseball coach at Howard College, now Samford University in 1926 and 1930 and at North Carolina State from 1940 to 1944, tallying a career college baseball mark of 29–67–2.

History
Newton was born in North Carolina on September 25, 1893.  He was the son of Reverend J.D. Newton and Martha Mills (whose father John Haymes Mills founded the first orphanage in the state of North Carolina).  Doc married Jean Lightfoot of Fayetteville, North Carolina.

His brother Adrian Jefferson Newton was the Clerk of the North Carolina Supreme Court for 35 years (from October 15, 1941 – December 1, 1976).

Baseball playing career
His sports career began as a minor league baseball player.  His minor league baseball career spanned from 1916 to 1928.  Playing for a number of teams, the most prestigious was the Baltimore Orioles AA team in the International League.

Baseball coaching career
Newton was a baseball coach of Gastonia American Legion Post 23 baseball’s program.  His tenure with the team was successful as they had a 140-50 record.  In 1935, he coached the team to win the National American Legion Championship.  He was eventually inducted into the American Legion Baseball Hall of Fame.

In addition, he coached baseball at Howard College (now Samford) in 1926 and 1930, at Davidson College, and at North Carolina State from 1940 to 1944.

Football coaching career
In 1931, he was on the coaching staff at the University of Tennessee.

Newton coached football at Davidson from 1932 to 1935 and compiled an 18–13–5 record.

From 1937 to 1945, he coached at North Carolina State, where he compiled a 24–39–6 record. Recruitment became difficult during at least part of his tenure as Head Coach due to the fact that World War II necessitated that eligible males over 18 be inducted into the U.S. military. In addition, the Army did not allow Army officer trainees studying at N.C. State to play on the football team.

While at North Carolina State, Newton started a fundraising club called "The Doc Newton Club."  It is currently known as the "Wolfpack Club."

In 1944, he coached at South Carolina and compiled a 3–4–2 record.

Head coaching record

Football

Ancestry

References

External links
 

1893 births
1970 deaths
Birmingham–Southern Panthers baseball coaches
Birmingham–Southern Panthers football coaches
Davidson Wildcats football coaches
Guilford Quakers football coaches
NC State Wolfpack baseball coaches
NC State Wolfpack football coaches
Samford Bulldogs baseball coaches
Samford Bulldogs football coaches
South Carolina Gamecocks football coaches
Tennessee Volunteers football coaches
People from Thomasville, North Carolina